John Thompson (c. 1886 – c. 1978) was a rugby union player who represented Australia.

Thompson, a flanker, was born in Warwick, Queensland and claimed 1 international rugby cap for Australia.

References

                   

Australian rugby union players
Australia international rugby union players
Year of death missing
Year of birth uncertain
Rugby union flankers
Rugby union players from Queensland